Walker-Hackensack-Akeley School District is a public school district in Cass County, Minnesota, United States, based in Walker, Minnesota.

The Walker-Hackensack-Akeley district was formed by the 1990 consolidation of the Walker and Akeley districts. Under Minnesota law it was a consolidation.

Schools
The Walker-Hackensac-Akeley School District has one elementary school and one high school.
Walker-Hackensack-Akeley Elementary School(W-H-A)
Walker-Hackensack-Akeley High School

References

External links

School districts in Minnesota
Education in Cass County, Minnesota